Salcia is a commune in Taraclia District, Moldova. It is composed of two villages, Orehovca and Salcia.

References

Communes of Taraclia District